Hell's Kitchen is an American reality competition cooking show that premiered on Fox on May 30, 2005. The series is hosted by celebrity chef Gordon Ramsay, who created and appeared in the British series of the same name. Each season, two teams of chefs compete for a job as head chef at a restaurant, while working in the kitchen of a restaurant set up in the television studio. A progressive elimination format reduces a field of 20 to 12 to a single winner over the course of each season. In a typical episode, a single contestant is selected for elimination. The series notably features Ramsay's explosive anger towards contestants, which in reality is heavily dramatized for the benefit of the audience. Hell's Kitchen has been nominated for six Primetime Emmy Awards. A chain of Gordon Ramsay Hell's Kitchen restaurants have been opened, inspired by the show.

On February 1, 2022, the series was renewed for a twenty-first and twenty-second season. The twenty-first season, subtitled Battle of the Ages, aired September 2022–February 2023.

Format 
Hell's Kitchen is a reality television show that uses a progressive elimination format to narrow down a field of 20 to 12 aspiring chefs to one single winner over the course of one season. The U.S. version of Hell's Kitchen follows the same format of the UK version, although the show is aired on tape delay and not performed live, nor is there audience participation in the elimination of chefs, who are also not celebrities as they are in the UK version. The show is produced at Hell's Kitchen, a modified warehouse in Los Angeles that includes the restaurant, dual kitchen facilities, and a dormitory where the chefs reside while on the show. They are also given knife sets that they get to keep, regardless of their progress.

At the start of each season, Gordon Ramsay breaks the chefs into two teams. With the exception of the first, 18th, and 21st seasons, this puts women on the red team and men on the blue team; each is given a chef's jacket with panels of that color on the shoulders. The chefs remain on these teams throughout most of the competition, but Ramsay may reassign a chef to the other team if the team numbers are uneven, wishes to experiment, or if he feels the chef will perform better on the other team. Each episode typically includes a challenge and a dinner service, followed by the elimination of a chef, or, under rare circumstances, multiple. When only five or six chefs remain, they are brought into a single common team wearing black-paneled jackets. From this point onward, they compete individually during challenges and work together during services to be one of the final two.

Challenges 
In challenges, the teams or individual is tasked with a cooking challenge by Ramsay. The type of challenges are varied, including ingredient preparation, meal preparation and taste tests. The first challenge of each season is a signature dish cook-off, giving the chefs an opportunity to show Ramsay their cooking.

Each season typically includes one or more challenges that allows teams to construct several dishes either for a banquet to be held the next dinner service or as part of designing their own menus. Other challenges typically include a "taste it, now make it" task, where chefs must attempt to recreate a dish Ramsay has prepared after tasting it only, and a "blind taste test" where chefs identify ingredients while blindfolded and wearing sound-blocking headphones. Some challenges have been full breakfast or lunch services, where the team completing the service first is declared the winner.

The winner of the challenge is determined by either a scoring system set for that challenge or by Ramsay's and/or guest judges' opinions. The winning team or chef receives a reward (a recreational activity away from Hell's Kitchen and other potential prizes), while the losing team or chefs are forced to do a mundane task, such as cleaning the kitchens, preparing a specific ingredient for the following dinner, having to prepare the food for both kitchens, and sometimes eating something unsavory (such as food waste blended into a smoothie) for lunch.

Dinner service 
For dinner services, the chefs are expected to work their station (appetizers, meat, fish, or garnish) on the kitchen line to prepare food in coordination with their teammates and to Ramsay's high standards for quality and presentation without his or the sous-chefs' assistance. Dinner service is for about 100 guests (volunteers for the show), with each diner expecting to receive an appetizer, an entree, and a dessert, although the desserts are overlooked for most services. The chefs are given menus and recipe books by Ramsay to study and memorize, which include some of Ramsay's more difficult dishes including risotto and Beef Wellington. The chefs spend several hours before each service preparing their ingredients.

Menus may be customized for a specific dinner service, such as ethnic-themed dishes or plates that resulted from the earlier challenge. Some seasons feature a service allowing for the teams to develop their own menus, which are reviewed by Ramsay for quality and presentation beforehand. Later episodes may feature a private dinner service, where each team must serve a five course meal to 12 guests, with each member leading their teammates to prepare one course. Dinner services may include additional challenges. A chef from each team may be asked to serve a table-side meal for their team, serve celebrities sitting at the kitchen's chef's table, or act as a server for the evening taking and fulfilling orders. After the chefs are on a single black team, the last dinner service before the finale usually has each chef run the pass as a test of their quality control, including deliberate mistakes made by the sous-chefs or Ramsay himself.

During a service, Ramsay demands that all orders for each course for a table go out together, and will send back entire orders if one item is improperly prepared, such as being over- or undercooked or not seasoned correctly, although he may send out incomplete orders to urge the chefs to get it together. While the chefs are in two teams, Ramsay is assisted by two trusted sous-chefs, each monitoring one of the kitchens, demanding the same standards and alerting Ramsay to any issues. Ramsay's goal is to complete every dinner service, but exceptionally poor kitchen performance by one or both teams will cause him to close their respective halves of the kitchen early and send them back to the dorms, thus ending the dinner service immediately (in the first three seasons, poor kitchen performance resulted in the restaurant being shut down and customers leaving hungry; Season 4 onward resulted in chefs being eliminated early and a professional cast of chefs finishing the service instead after complaints of customers not being fed forced a rule change). Ramsay may also evict individual chefs from the kitchen based on repeated poor performances during a service (in more recent seasons, he has largely refrained from this practice and more often times than not will remove the entire team at once if he sees fit) and on rare occasions (once every two seasons on average), may eliminate a chef on the spot. Chefs may also walk out when under pressure from Ramsay, which more often than not will lead to their withdrawal from the show.

Elimination 
Once the dinner service is complete, Ramsay gathers everyone in the kitchen, announces which team is the losing team and directs them to select two members of their team as nominees for elimination. It is possible that both teams are declared losers or a different number of chefs may be requested for nomination (usually three chefs in such cases). In some cases, Ramsay has named both teams winners but still requires them to each nominate someone for elimination. This is a group consensus, but Ramsay may occasionally name a chef "best of the worst" or "best of the best" on their team and instruct them to choose the nominees. This concept, however, has faded away over time due to the contestants sometimes making nominations based on personal bias rather than kitchen performance. Ramsay has also on some occasions declared that nobody would be sent home but those cases are generally accompanied by a double elimination the following service, a team reassignment or occur after someone has been sent home on the spot for insubordination or exceptionally poor performance.

Ramsay reassembles the teams in the dining hall and stands about ten feet away from the losing team, before choosing a random contestant on the team to announce the nominations. If there is a winning team, they will often congregate at a nearby table by Ramsay during the process. Once all nominations have been announced, Ramsay will beckon all nominated contestants (in addition, he can also void a nomination or nominate other chefs for elimination if he sees fit) from the losing team and ask each of them to explain why they should stay in Hell's Kitchen. After giving these nominees the chance to defend themselves, Ramsay selects one to hand over their jacket and "leave Hell's Kitchen." On rarer occasions, Ramsay can overrule nominations or even eliminate a chef who has not been nominated, which can include a chef on a winning team.

The eliminated chef is subsequently shown leaving the restaurant through a hallway while providing some last thoughts on the experience (in cases where contestants are eliminated mid-service, they will often head back to the dorms to retrieve their belongings before their last interview). After dismissing the chefs, Ramsay goes back upstairs to his office. He symbolically hangs the chef's jacket on a sharp hook below their picture in a row with the others, igniting the chef's picture and signaling their departure (in the first season, he simply hung their jacket and the camera would zoom in on the eliminated chef's name). During this scene, there is a voice-over of Ramsay explaining his reasons for eliminating the chef; albeit humorously at times (in the first season, he simply addressed the show's progress on camera to the viewers). If an eliminated chef has performed exceptionally well, Ramsay may allow them to keep their jacket as a token of their success up to that point, if he sees fit.

Chefs may be eliminated from the competition due to medical reasons, both voluntarily and involuntarily. Chefs that violate the competition's rules may be immediately eliminated, mainly during dinner service. Chefs may also exit the competition voluntarily for any other reason; though this is not encouraged, their wishes are ultimately granted (with reasons by Ramsay explained, if applicable).

Once the number of chefs drops below a certain level (usually once five or six are left) they are awarded black jackets and assembled into a single team. In the most recent seasons, black jackets are awarded by a series of rigorous individual challenges rather than dinner service, with contestants not receiving black jackets being eliminated. Eliminations continue until the final two contestants are left (in some cases involving the final four contestants, a double elimination will occur to leave the final two).

Final service 
In the finale, the final two chefs are each given the opportunity to develop their own menus and lead a brigade of former competitors through a full dinner service on their own. In the first five seasons, this included the opportunity to decorate half of the Hell's Kitchen restaurant to their liking. Prior to the dinner service, the two chefs compete in a challenge to prepare their menus, and the winner will earn the advantage of picking their brigade of chefs first. Ramsay will ensure that all menu items meet his standards for high cuisine prior to service, and he and his sous chefs will oversee the service to make sure that his high quality standards are retained, but does not otherwise get involved, allowing the two remaining chefs to demonstrate their ability to run the line. The finalists are allowed to reassign stations, or even kick their teammates out of the kitchen should they see fit; the latter has happened four times in the show's history, including Ramsay himself kicking one of the brigade members out. On one occasion, a chef had walked out of service under their own accord.

Ramsay uses his own observations and those from the diners and other sources to decide who is the winning chef. He has two doors in his office leading out to the balcony above the Hell's Kitchen seating area. Each chef stands at a door and Ramsay tells them to both turn their handles at the same time. After a commercial break, only the door of the winning chef is unlocked allowing the winner to walk through and be greeted by the crowd below. The winning chef receives two prizes including the opportunity to work as the head chef or executive chef at a restaurant of Ramsay's choosing, as well as a cash prize of $250,000. In a similar manner to the voiceover at each elimination, Ramsay has a voiceover to explain his reasons for choosing that chef as the winner. In addition, the winner hangs a picture of themselves alongside the previous winners that is seen at the restaurant's front entrance.

Cast 

Gordon Ramsay is the head chef. Jason Thompson is the narrator. Jean-Philippe Susilovic, a Belgian maître d'hôtel, comes from Pétrus, one of Ramsay's London restaurants and appeared in the first seven seasons. Susilovic was also the maître d'hôtel for the first series of the original British version. James Lukanik replaced Susilovic for seasons eight–ten. Susilovic returned for seasons 11 and 12, before being replaced on a permanent basis by Marino Monferrato. During Season 21, Marino was away between episodes two and nine, so Matthew Childs temporarily filled in for him as maître d'. Each team also has the services of one of two sous-chefs. Season 10 winner Christina Wilson is the current red team sous-chef, with season 7 runner-up Jason Santos as the current blue team sous-chef.

Previous sous-chefs were MaryAnn Salcedo, Gloria Felix, second season winner Heather West, Andi Van Willigan-Cutspec, Scott Leibfried, James Avery, Aaron Mitrano, and James "Jocky" Petrie. In season 15, Wilson filled in for Van Willigan-Cutspec (who was getting married at the time of filming, but returned for one episode when her reception was one of the themed dinner services for that season). Van Willigan-Cutspec returned in season 16, but was replaced by Wilson again for seasons 17 onwards due to personal reasons.

Production

Broadcasting 
The theme song is "Fire" by the Ohio Players. When the U.S. version is broadcast in the U.K., Italy, Portugal and some countries (shown on the table below), it features only the instrumental version. The instrumental version also appeared in the uncensored DVD release for the U.S. version.

Setting 
For the show's first two seasons, the Hell's Kitchen restaurant set itself was housed in the former studios of Los Angeles television station KCOP at 915 North La Brea Avenue, in Hollywood, which at one time hosted production of game shows  Tic Tac Dough and The Joker's Wild. KCOP was acquired by News Corporation in 2001 and its studios were integrated with those of Fox affiliate KTTV in 2003, leaving the La Brea facility vacant. Originally the studio was put up for sale, but in the end they were retooled for the production of Hell's Kitchen. The dining room area was the location of the former KCOP news studios, and living quarters for the contestants were built behind the restaurant. 

Before season three, the Hell's Kitchen facility was moved to Century Studios at 3322 La Cienega Place in Los Angeles. From seasons 4-18, Hell's Kitchen's venue has been located at 8660 Hayden Place in Culver City. According to Arthur Perkins, the soundstage is only open for audience members when taping is taking place. The studio sits on the former location of the RKO Forty Acres backlot, which was used in movies such as Gone With The Wind and television series such as The Andy Griffith Show and Adventures of Superman. The studio building sits on the location of the military camp seen in the television series Gomer Pyle, U.S.M.C..

The first 18 seasons were produced at those modified warehouses in Los Angeles which included the restaurant, dual kitchen facilities, and dormitories where the contestants resided while on the show. The nineteenth and twentieth seasons were filmed at the Caesars Entertainment Studios property near the Las Vegas Strip. Seasons 21 and 22 were shot back-to-back in Burbank, California, in what used to be an IKEA building.

Accusations of staging 
The series has drawn numerous online and editorial accusations of staging and dramatic license, mostly due to editing techniques of the producers, who splice together several hours of footage from a dinner service, in order to make certain contestants appear as poor performers, later justifying their elimination. This was most obvious when one episode featured clips showing Amanda "Tek" Moore, who was already eliminated, in the background, still cooking three episodes after her elimination.

One of the most controversial accusations of staging on Hell's Kitchen relates to an incident with contestant Joseph Tinnelly from Season 6, who, during one elimination round, angrily confronted Ramsay, challenging him to fight, and was then escorted off the set. The incident drew immediate fire from critics as an overplayed and possibly faked scene, conducted to cause action and tension on the show in order to spark viewer interest.

Series overview

Notes

Reception

Awards and nominations 
Hell's Kitchen has been nominated for three Primetime Emmy Awards in the Outstanding Art Direction for Variety, Music or Nonfiction Programming category in 2007, 2008, and 2009. It has also been nominated for two Art Directors Guild Awards in the Television — Awards Show, Variety, Music or Non-Fiction Program category in 2007 and 2008, winning one in 2008. It has also been nominated for a Teen Choice Award for Choice Summer Series.

In 2009, Gordon Ramsay won an Astra Award for Favourite International Personality or Actor.

At the 2011 People's Choice Awards, Hell's Kitchen was nominated for Favorite Reality Show and Gordon Ramsay was nominated for Favorite TV Chef.

At the 2014 Reality TV Awards ceremony, Hell's Kitchen won an award for best new cast. In 2015, Hell's Kitchen won awards for best overall show and guilty pleasure at the 2015 Reality TV Awards.

U.S. Nielsen ratings

Other media

Home media 
Visual Entertainment (under license from ITV Studios) has released the first fourteen seasons of Hell's Kitchen on DVD in Region 1. Season 14 was released on March 15, 2016, and to the Blu-ray format for the first time.

In Region 4, Shock Entertainment has released seasons 1–8 on DVD in Australia.

Video games 
On September 11, 2008, Ubisoft released Hell's Kitchen: The Game for the Wii, Nintendo DS, Microsoft Windows, and iOS, which features the likeness of Ramsay, and the many important tasks shown in the U.S. version of the show.

On April 2, 2009, Ludia and Social2u released the official Facebook version of the Hell's Kitchen video game.

References

External links 

 
 

 
2005 American television series debuts
2000s American cooking television series
2010s American cooking television series
2020s American cooking television series
Television series by ITV Studios
Television series by 20th Century Fox Television
Fox Broadcasting Company original programming
English-language television shows
Reality competition television series
Television shows featuring audio description
Television shows adapted into video games
Television shows filmed in Los Angeles